Dissociative identity disorder (DID), previously named multiple personality disorder and commonly referred to as split personality disorder or dissociative personality disorder, is a member of the family of dissociative disorders classified by the DSM-V, DSM-V-TR, ICD 10, ICD 11, and Merck Manual for diagnosis. Dissociative identity disorder is characterized by primarily dissociative disorder symptoms, secondary key symptoms are shared with complex PTSD, Borderline and Schizotypal Personality disorders and tertiary key symptoms are shared with fibromyalgia, sleep disturbances, eating disorders, and body dysmorphic symptoms. Personality states alternately show in a person's behavior; however, presentations of the disorder vary. Dissociative identity disorder is usually caused by excessive and unendurable stress and or trauma, which commonly happens in childhood. The sense of a unified Identity develops from a variety of experiences and sources. In a child who is overwhelmed, the factors that should have blended together or become integrated overtime instead remain separate. Childhood adversity and abuse often leads to the development of dissociative identity disorder, but not exclusively.

Overview
Dissociative identity disorder (DID) is a member of the family of dissociative disorders classified by the DSM-IV, DSM-V-TR, ICD 10, ICD 11, and Merck Manual. There are sources claiming DID can't form after childhood, and that Dissociative Identity Disorder is childhood trauma exclusive but there is disagreement about that.

The DSM, ICD and Merck Manual do not state that Dissociative Identity Disorder is trauma exclusive or childhood trauma exclusive. DID commonly arises due to childhood trauma but not exclusively. "The disorder may begin at any age, from early childhood to late life."- Merck Manual

Dissociative Identity Disorder can arise from many reasons that are not as common as childhood trauma. Other extreme complex traumas such as combat in wars or attachment disturbance, natural disaster, adversity, cult and occult abuse, loss of a loved one or loved ones, human trafficking, extreme medical diagnoses (eg. rare brain cancers, Aracnoid Cysts, Temporal lobe epilepsy and Geschwind syndrome, traumatic brain injury) or surgeries, extreme family conditions, and a combination of traumas could all cause an already fragile mind to split into multiple personality states. "Some patients have not been abused but have experienced an important early loss (such as death of a parent), serious medical illness, or other overwhelmingly stressful events."- Merck Manual

Dissociative Identity Disorder is more difficult to develop in someone older. It is more likely for adults to develop CPTSD, adjustment disorders, BPD and/or StPD because the mind is less fragile, they have a better integrated self-perception and identity, and their attachment style is more stable, as it is claimed. It is still largely unclear why the brain processes trauma into dissociative disorders, trauma disorders, [adjustment disorders], and personality disorders., People likely develop DID under factors of stressors, attachment disturbance, and trauma, which is why childhood trauma on fragile minds are also more common in developing DID.

Cause and diagnosis
DID requires an unintegrated mind to form. Genetic and biological factors are also believed to play a role. The diagnosis should not be made if the person's condition is better accounted for by substance use disorder, seizures, other mental health problems, imaginative play in children, or religious practices.

Dissociative identity disorder (DID), formerly known as multiple personality disorder or multiple personality syndrome, is a mental disorder characterized by the presence of at least two distinct and relatively enduring personality states.

The disorder is accompanied by memory gaps more severe than could be explained by ordinary forgetfulness. The personality states alternately show in a person's behavior; however, presentations of the disorder vary. Other conditions that often occur in people with DID include post-traumatic stress disorder, personality disorders (especially borderline, Schizotypal and avoidant), depression, substance use disorders, conversion disorder, somatic symptom disorder, eating disorders, obsessive–compulsive disorder, and sleep disorders. Self-harm, non-epileptic seizures, flashbacks with amnesia for content of flashbacks, anxiety disorders, and suicidality are also common.

Treatment and epidemiology
There is no medication to treat DID as there are for other mental disorders. Treatment generally involves supportive care and psychotherapy. The condition usually persists without treatment. It is believed to affect about 1.5% of the general population (based on a small US community sample) and 3% of those admitted to hospitals with mental health issues in Europe and North America. DID is diagnosed about six times more often in women than in men. The number of recorded cases increased significantly in the latter half of the 20th century, along with the number of identities reported by those affected.

It is unclear whether increased rates of the disorder are due to better recognition or sociocultural factors such as mass media portrayals. The typical presenting symptoms in different regions of the world may also vary depending on culture, such as alter identities taking the form of possessing spirits, deities, ghosts, or mythical creatures and figures in cultures where normative possession states are common. The possession form of dissociative identity disorder is involuntary and distressing, and occurs in a way that violates cultural or religious norms.

Hypnosis should be carefully considered when choosing both treatment and provider practitioners because of its dangers. For example, hypnosis can sometimes lead to false memories and false accusations of abuse by family, loved ones, friends, providers, and community members. Those who suffer from Dissociative Identity Disorder have commonly been subject to actual abuse (sexual, physical, emotional, financial) by therapists, family, friends, loved ones, and community members.

Definitions
Dissociation, the term that underlies dissociative disorders including DID, lacks a precise, empirical, and generally agreed upon definition.

A large number of diverse experiences have been termed dissociative, ranging from normal failures in attention to the breakdowns in memory processes characterized by the dissociative disorders. It is therefore unknown if there is a commonality between all dissociative experiences, or if the range of mild to severe symptoms is a result of different etiologies and biological structures. Other terms used in the literature, including personality, personality state, identity, ego state, and amnesia, also have no agreed upon definitions. Multiple competing models exist that incorporate some non-dissociative symptoms while excluding dissociative ones.

Due to the lack of consensus regarding terminology in the study of DID, several terms have been proposed. One is ego state (behaviors and experiences possessing permeable boundaries with other such states but united by a common sense of self), while the other term is alters (each of which may have a separate autobiographical memory, independent initiative and a sense of ownership over individual behavior).

Ellert Nijenhuis and colleagues suggest a distinction between personalities responsible for day-to-day functioning (associated with blunted physiological responses and reduced emotional reactivity, referred to as the "apparently normal part of the personality" or ANP) and those emerging in survival situations (involving fight-or-flight responses, vivid traumatic memories and strong, painful emotions – the "emotional part of the personality" or EP). "Structural dissociation of the personality" is used by Otto van der Hart and colleagues to distinguish dissociation they attribute to traumatic or pathological causes, which in turn is divided into primary, secondary and tertiary dissociation. According to this hypothesis, primary dissociation involves one ANP and one EP, while secondary dissociation involves one ANP and at least two EPs and tertiary dissociation, which is unique to DID, is described as having at least two ANPs and at least two EPs. Others have suggested dissociation can be separated into two distinct forms, detachment and compartmentalization, the latter of which, involving a failure to control normally controllable processes or actions, is most evident in DID. Efforts to psychometrically distinguish between normal and pathological dissociation have been made.

Signs and symptoms
According to the fifth edition of the Diagnostic and Statistical Manual of Mental Disorders (DSM-5), symptoms of DID include "the presence of two or more distinct personality states" accompanied by the inability to recall personal information beyond what is expected through normal memory issues. Other DSM-5 symptoms include a loss of identity as related to individual distinct personality states, loss of one's subjective experience of the passage of time, and degradation of a sense of self and consciousness. In each individual, the clinical presentation varies and the level of functioning can change from severe impairment to minimal impairment. The symptoms of dissociative amnesia are subsumed under a DID diagnosis, and thus should not be diagnosed separately if DID criteria are met. Individuals with DID may experience distress from both the symptoms of DID (intrusive thoughts or emotions) and the consequences of the accompanying symptoms (dissociation rendering them unable to remember specific information). The majority of patients with DID report childhood sexual or physical abuse.<ref name =Mer2019Pro  Amnesia between identities may be asymmetrical; identities may or may not be aware of what is known by another. Individuals with DID may be reluctant to discuss symptoms due to associations with abuse, shame, and fear. DID patients may also frequently and intensely experience time disturbances.

Around half of people with DID have fewer than 10 identities and most have fewer than 100; although as many as 4,500 have been reported. The average number of identities has increased over the past few decades, from two or three to now an average of approximately 16. However, it is unclear whether this is due to an actual increase in identities, or simply that the psychiatric community has become more accepting of a high number of compartmentalized memory components.

Comorbid disorders
The psychiatric history frequently contains multiple previous diagnoses of various disorders and treatment failures. The most common presenting complaint of DID is depression, with headaches being a common neurological symptom. Comorbid disorders can include substance use disorder, eating disorders, anxiety disorders, bipolar disorder, and personality disorders. A significant percentage of those diagnosed with DID have histories of borderline personality disorder and post-traumatic stress disorder (PTSD). Presentations of dissociation in people with schizophrenia differ from those with DID as not being rooted in trauma, and this distinction can be effectively tested, although both conditions share a high rate of dissociative auditory hallucinations. Other disorders that have been found to be comorbid with DID are somatization disorders, major depressive disorder, as well as history of a past suicide attempt, in comparison to those without a DID diagnosis. Individuals diagnosed with DID demonstrate the highest hypnotizability of any clinical population. Although DID has high comorbidity and its development is related to trauma, there exists evidence to suggest that DID merits a separate diagnosis from other conditions like PTSD.

Borderline personality disorder
The DSM-IV-TR states that self-harm, impulsivity, and rapid changes in interpersonal relationships "may warrant a concurrent diagnosis of borderline personality disorder." Steven Lynn and colleagues have suggested that the significant overlap between BPD and DID may be a contributing factor to the development of therapy induced DID, in that the suggestion of hidden alters by therapists who propose a diagnosis of DID provides an explanation to patients for the behavioral instability, self-mutilation, unpredictable mood changes and actions they experience. In 1993 a group of researchers reviewed both DID and borderline personality disorder (BPD), concluding that DID was an epiphenomenon of BPD, with no tests or clinical description capable of distinguishing between the two. Their conclusions about the empirical proof of DID were echoed by a second group, who still believed the diagnosis existed, but while the knowledge to date did not justify DID as a separate diagnosis, it also did not disprove its existence. Reviews of medical records and psychological tests indicated that the majority of DID patients could be diagnosed with BPD instead, though about a third could not, suggesting that DID does exist but may be over-diagnosed. Both groups also report higher rates of physical and sexual abuse than the general population, and patients with BPD also score highly on measures of dissociation. Even using strict diagnostic criteria, it can be difficult to distinguish between dissociative disorders and BPD (as well as bipolar disorder and schizophrenia), though the presence of comorbid anxiety disorders may help.

Causes

General
DID is etiologically complex. Şar et al. state, "Dissociative identity disorder (DID) is multifactorial in its etiology. Whereas psychosocial etiologies of DID include developmental traumatization and sociocognitive sequelae, biological factors include trauma-generated neurobiological responses. Biologically derived traits and epigenetic mechanisms are also likely to be at play. At this point, no direct examination of genetics has occurred in DID. However, it is likely to exist, given the genetic link to dissociation in general and in relation to childhood adversity in particular." Stating that there is "a lack of understanding regarding the etiopathology of DID", Blihar adds that "many researchers and psychiatrists regard DID as the most severe form of a childhood onset post-traumatic stress disorder (PTSD) because it is virtually impossible to find a DID patient without a history of PTSD. ... There are currently two competing theories regarding the relationship between trauma and dissociation: the trauma-related model and the fantasy-prone model."

The DSM-5 diagnostic manual states that DID is "associated with overwhelming experiences, traumatic events, and/or abuse during childhood". Other risk factors reported include childhood neglect, childhood medical procedures, war, terrorism, and childhood prostitution. Dissociative disorders frequently occur after trauma, and the DSM5 places them after the trauma and stressor-related disorders to reflect this close relationship. Disturbed and altered sleep has also been suggested as having a role in dissociative disorders in general and specifically in DID, alterations in environments also largely affecting the DID patient.

Developmental trauma

People diagnosed with DID often report that they have experienced physical or sexual abuse during childhood (although the accuracy of these reports has been disputed); others report overwhelming stress, serious medical illness or other traumatic events during childhood. They also report more historical psychological trauma than those diagnosed with any other mental illness.

Severe sexual, physical, or psychological trauma in childhood has been proposed as an explanation for its development; awareness, memories and emotions of harmful actions or events caused by the trauma are removed from consciousness, and alternate personalities or subpersonalities form with differing memories, emotions and behavior. DID is attributed to extremes of stress or disorders of attachment. What may be expressed as post-traumatic stress disorder (PTSD) in adults may become DID when occurring in children, possibly due to their greater use of imagination as a form of coping.

Possibly due to developmental changes and a more coherent sense of self past the age of six, the experience of extreme trauma may result in different, though also complex, dissociative symptoms and identity disturbances. A specific relationship between childhood abuse, disorganized attachment, and lack of social support are thought to be a necessary component of DID. Although what role a child's biological capacity to dissociate to an extreme level remains unclear, some evidence indicates a neurobiological impact of developmental stress.

Delinking early trauma from the etiology of dissociation has been explicitly rejected by those supporting the early trauma model. However, a 2012 review article supports the hypothesis that current or recent trauma may affect an individual's assessment of the more distant past, changing the experience of the past and resulting in dissociative states. Giesbrecht et al. have suggested there is no actual empirical evidence linking early trauma to dissociation, and instead suggest that problems with neuropsychological functioning, such as increased distractibility in response to certain emotions and contexts, account for dissociative features. A middle position hypothesizes that trauma, in some situations, alters neuronal mechanisms related to memory. Evidence is increasing that dissociative disorders are related both to a trauma history and to "specific neural mechanisms". It has also been suggested that there may be a genuine but more modest link between trauma and DID, with early trauma causing increased fantasy-proneness, which may in turn render individuals more vulnerable to socio-cognitive influences surrounding the development of DID. Another suggestion made by Hart indicates that there are triggers in the brain that can be the catalyst for different self-states, and that victims of trauma are more susceptible to these triggers than non-victims of trauma; these triggers are said to be related to DID.

Paris states that the trauma model of DID increased the appeal of the diagnosis among health care providers, patients and the public as it validated the idea that child abuse had lifelong, serious effects. Paris asserts that there is very little experimental evidence supporting the trauma-dissociation hypothesis, and no research showing that dissociation consistently links to long-term memory disruption.

Therapist-induced
The prevailing post-traumatic model of dissociation and dissociative disorders is contested. It has been hypothesized that symptoms of DID may be created by therapists using techniques to "recover" memories (such as the use of hypnosis to "access" alter identities, facilitate age regression or retrieve memories) on suggestible individuals. Referred to as the "sociocognitive model" (SCM), it proposes that DID is due to a person consciously or unconsciously behaving in certain ways promoted by cultural stereotypes, with unwitting therapists providing cues through improper therapeutic techniques. This model posits that behavior is enhanced by media portrayals of DID.

Proponents of the SCM note that the bizarre dissociative symptoms are rarely present before intensive therapy by specialists in the treatment of DID who, through the process of eliciting, conversing with and identifying alters, shape or possibly create the diagnosis. While proponents note that DID is accompanied by genuine suffering and the distressing symptoms, and can be diagnosed reliably using the DSM criteria, they are skeptical of the traumatic etiology suggested by proponents. The characteristics of people diagnosed with DID (hypnotizability, suggestibility, frequent fantasization and mental absorption) contributed to these concerns and those regarding the validity of recovered memories of trauma. Skeptics note that a small subset of doctors are responsible for diagnosing the majority of individuals with DID. Psychologist Nicholas Spanos and others have suggested that in addition to therapy caused cases, DID may be the result of role-playing rather than alternative identities, though others disagree, pointing to a lack of incentive to manufacture or maintain separate identities and point to the claimed histories of abuse. Other arguments that therapy can cause DID, include the lack of children diagnosed with DID, the sudden spike in rates of diagnosis after 1980 (although DID was not a diagnosis until DSM-IV, published in 1994), the absence of evidence of increased rates of child abuse, the appearance of the disorder almost exclusively in individuals undergoing psychotherapy, particularly involving hypnosis, the presences of bizarre alternate identities (such as those claiming to be animals or mythological creatures) and an increase in the number of alternate identities over time (as well as an initial increase in their number as psychotherapy begins in DID-oriented therapy). These various cultural and therapeutic causes occur within a context of pre-existing psychopathology, notably borderline personality disorder, which is commonly comorbid with DID. In addition, presentations can vary across cultures, such as Indian patients who only switch alters after a period of sleep – which is commonly how DID is presented by the media within that country.

Proponents of psychotherapy as a cause of DID state that DID is strongly linked to (possibly suggestive) psychotherapy, often involving recovered memories (memories that the person previously had amnesia for) or false memories, and that such therapy could cause additional identities. Such memories could be used to make an allegation of child sexual abuse. There is little agreement between those who see therapy as a cause and trauma as a cause. Supporters of therapy as a cause of DID suggest that a small number of clinicians diagnosing a disproportionate number of cases would provide evidence for their position though it has also been claimed that higher rates of diagnosis in specific countries like the United States may be due to greater awareness of DID. Lower rates in other countries may be due to artificially low recognition of the diagnosis. However, false memory syndrome per se is not regarded by mental health experts as a valid diagnosis, and has been described as "a non-psychological term originated by a private foundation whose stated purpose is to support accused parents," and critics argue that the concept has no empirical support, and further describe the False Memory Syndrome Foundation as an advocacy group that has distorted and misrepresented memory research.

Children

The rarity of DID diagnosis in children is cited as a reason to doubt the validity of DID, and proponents of both etiologies believe that the discovery of DID in a child who had never undergone treatment would critically undermine the SCM. Conversely, if children are found to develop DID only after undergoing treatment it would challenge the traumagenic model. , approximately 250 cases of DID in children have been identified, though the data does not offer unequivocal support for either theory. While children have been diagnosed with DID before therapy, several were presented to clinicians by parents who were themselves diagnosed with DID; others were influenced by the appearance of DID in popular culture or due to a diagnosis of psychosis due to hearing voices – a symptom also found in DID. No studies have looked for children with DID in the general population, and the single study that attempted to look for children with DID not already in therapy did so by examining siblings of those already in therapy for DID. An analysis of diagnosis of children reported in scientific publications, 44 case studies of single patients were found to be evenly distributed (i.e., each case study was reported by a different author) but in articles regarding groups of patients, four researchers were responsible for the majority of the reports.

The initial theoretical description of DID was that dissociative symptoms were a means of coping with extreme stress (particularly childhood sexual and physical abuse), but this belief has been challenged by the data of multiple research studies. Proponents of the traumagenic hypothesis claim the high correlation of child sexual and physical abuse reported by adults with DID corroborates the link between trauma and DID. However, the DID–maltreatment link has been questioned for several reasons. The studies reporting the links often rely on self-report rather than independent corroborations, and these results may be worsened by selection and referral bias. Most studies of trauma and dissociation are cross-sectional rather than longitudinal, which means researchers can not attribute causation, and studies avoiding recall bias have failed to corroborate such a causal link. In addition, studies rarely control for the many disorders comorbid with DID, or family maladjustment (which is itself highly correlated with DID). The popular association of DID with childhood abuse is relatively recent, occurring only after the publication of Sybil in 1973. Most previous examples of "multiples" such as Chris Costner Sizemore, whose life was depicted in the book and film The Three Faces of Eve, disclosed no history of child abuse.

Pathophysiology
Despite research on DID including structural and functional magnetic resonance imaging, positron emission tomography, single-photon emission computed tomography, event-related potential, and electroencephalography, no convergent neuroimaging findings have been identified regarding DID, making it difficult to hypothesize a biological basis for DID. In addition, many of the studies that do exist were performed from an explicitly trauma-based position, and did not consider the possibility of therapy as a cause of DID. There is no research to date regarding the neuroimaging and introduction of false memories in DID patients, though there is evidence of changes in visual parameters and support for amnesia between alters. DID patients also appear to show deficiencies in tests of conscious control of attention and memorization (which also showed signs of compartmentalization for implicit memory between alters but no such compartmentalization for verbal memory) and increased and persistent vigilance and startle responses to sound. DID patients may also demonstrate altered neuroanatomy. Experimental tests of memory suggest that patients with DID may have improved memory for certain tasks, which has been used to criticize the hypothesis that DID is a means of forgetting or suppressing memory. Patients also show experimental evidence of being more fantasy-prone, which in turn is related to a tendency to over-report false memories of painful events.

Diagnosis

General
The fifth, revised edition of the American Psychiatric Association's Diagnostic and Statistical Manual of Mental Disorders (DSM-5) diagnoses DID according to the diagnostic criteria found under code 300.14 (dissociative disorders). DID is often initially misdiagnosed because clinicians receive little training about dissociative disorders or DID, and often use standard diagnostic interviews that do not include questions about trauma, dissociation or post-traumatic symptoms. This contributes to difficulties diagnosing the disorder and clinician bias.

DID is rarely diagnosed in children, despite the average age of appearance of the first alter being three years old. The criteria require that an individual be recurrently controlled by two or more discrete identities or personality states, accompanied by memory lapses for important information that is not caused by alcohol, drugs or medications and other medical conditions such as complex partial seizures. In children the symptoms must not be better explained by "imaginary playmates or other fantasy play". Diagnosis is normally performed by a clinically trained mental health professional such as a psychiatrist or psychologist through clinical evaluation, interviews with family and friends, and consideration of other ancillary material. Specially designed interviews (such as the SCID-D) and personality assessment tools may be used in the evaluation as well. Since most of the symptoms depend on self-report and are not concrete and observable, there is a degree of subjectivity in making the diagnosis. People are often disinclined to seek treatment, especially since their symptoms may not be taken seriously; thus dissociative disorders have been referred to as "diseases of hiddenness".

The diagnosis has been criticized by supporters of therapy as a cause or the sociocognitive hypothesis as they believe it is a culture-bound and often health care induced condition. The social cues involved in diagnosis may be instrumental in shaping patient behavior or attribution, such that symptoms within one context may be linked to DID, while in another time or place the diagnosis could have been something other than DID. Other researchers disagree and argue that the existence of the condition and its inclusion in the DSM is supported by multiple lines of reliable evidence, with diagnostic criteria allowing it to be clearly discriminated from conditions it is often mistaken for (schizophrenia, borderline personality disorder, and seizure disorder). That a large proportion of cases are diagnosed by specific health care providers, and that symptoms have been created in nonclinical research subjects given appropriate cueing has been suggested as evidence that a small number of clinicians who specialize in DID are responsible for the creation of alters through therapy. The condition may be under-diagnosed due to skepticism and lack of awareness from mental health professionals, made difficult due to the lack of specific and reliable criteria for diagnosing DID as well as a lack of prevalence rates due to the failure to examine systematically selected and representative populations.

Differential diagnoses
People with DID are diagnosed with five to seven comorbid disorders on average – much higher than other mental illnesses.

Due to overlapping symptoms, the differential diagnosis includes schizophrenia, normal and rapid-cycling bipolar disorder, epilepsy, borderline personality disorder, and autism spectrum disorder. Delusions or auditory hallucinations can be mistaken for speech by other personalities. Persistence and consistency of identities and behavior, amnesia, measures of dissociation or hypnotizability and reports from family members or other associates indicating a history of such changes can help distinguish DID from other conditions. A diagnosis of DID takes precedence over any other dissociative disorders. Distinguishing DID from malingering is a concern when financial or legal gains are an issue, and factitious disorder may also be considered if the person has a history of help or attention-seeking. Individuals who state that their symptoms are due to external spirits or entities entering their bodies are generally diagnosed with dissociative disorder not otherwise specified rather than DID due to the lack of identities or personality states. Most individuals who enter an emergency department and are unaware of their names are generally in a psychotic state. Although auditory hallucinations are common in DID, complex visual hallucinations may also occur. Those with DID generally have adequate reality testing; they may have positive Schneiderian symptoms of schizophrenia but lack the negative symptoms. They perceive any voices heard as coming from inside their heads (patients with schizophrenia experience them as external). In addition, individuals with psychosis are much less susceptible to hypnosis than those with DID. Difficulties in differential diagnosis are increased in children.

DID must be distinguished from, or determined if comorbid with, a variety of disorders including mood disorders, psychosis, anxiety disorders, PTSD, personality disorders, cognitive disorders, neurological disorders, epilepsy, somatoform disorder, factitious disorder, malingering, other dissociative disorders, and trance states. An additional aspect of the controversy of diagnosis is that there are many forms of dissociation and memory lapses, which can be common in both stressful and nonstressful situations and can be attributed to much less controversial diagnoses. Individuals faking or mimicking DID due to factitious disorder will typically exaggerate symptoms (particularly when observed), lie, blame bad behavior on symptoms and often show little distress regarding their apparent diagnosis. In contrast, genuine people with DID typically exhibit confusion, distress and shame regarding their symptoms and history.

A relationship between DID and borderline personality disorder has been posited, with various clinicians noting overlap between symptoms and behaviors and it has been suggested that some cases of DID may arise "from a substrate of borderline traits". Reviews of DID patients and their medical records concluded that the majority of those diagnosed with DID would also meet the criteria for either borderline personality disorder or more generally borderline personality.

The DSM-5 elaborates on cultural background as an influence for some presentations of DID.

Controversy
DID is among the most controversial of the dissociative disorders and among the most controversial disorders found in the DSM-5. The primary dispute is between those who believe DID is caused by traumatic stresses forcing the mind to split into multiple identities, each with a separate set of memories, and the belief that the symptoms of DID are produced artificially by certain psychotherapeutic practices or patients playing a role they believe appropriate for a person with DID. The debate between the two positions is characterized by intense disagreement. Research into this hypothesis has been characterized by poor methodology. Psychiatrist Joel Paris notes that the idea that a personality is capable of splitting into independent alters is an unproven assertion that is at odds with research in cognitive psychology.

Some believe that DID is caused by health care, i.e. symptoms of DID are created by therapists themselves via hypnosis. This belief also implies that those with DID are more susceptible to manipulation by hypnosis and suggestion than others.  The iatrogenic model also sometimes states that treatment for DID is harmful. According to Brand, Loewenstein and Spiegel, "[t]he claims that DID treatment is harmful are based on anecdotal cases, opinion pieces, reports of damage that are not substantiated in the scientific literature, misrepresentations of the data, and misunderstandings about DID treatment and the phenomenology of DID". Their claim is evinced by the fact that only 5%–10% of people receiving treatment worsen in their symptoms.

Psychiatrists August Piper and Harold Merskey have challenged the trauma hypothesis, arguing that correlation does not imply causation – the fact that people with DID report childhood trauma does not mean trauma causes DID – and point to the rareness of the diagnosis before 1980 as well as a failure to find DID as an outcome in longitudinal studies of traumatized children. They assert that DID cannot be accurately diagnosed because of vague and unclear diagnostic criteria in the DSM and undefined concepts such as "personality state" and "identities", and question the evidence for childhood abuse beyond self-reports, the lack of definition of what would indicate a threshold of abuse sufficient to induce DID and the extremely small number of cases of children diagnosed with DID despite an average age of appearance of the first alter of three years. Psychiatrist Colin Ross disagrees with Piper and Merskey's conclusion that DID cannot be accurately diagnosed, pointing to internal consistency between different structured dissociative disorder interviews (including the Dissociative Experiences Scale, Dissociative Disorders Interview Schedule and Structured Clinical Interview for Dissociative Disorders) that are in the internal validity range of widely accepted mental illnesses such as schizophrenia and major depressive disorder. In his opinion, Piper and Merskey are setting the standard of proof higher than they are for other diagnoses. He also asserts that Piper and Merskey have cherry-picked data and not incorporated all relevant scientific literature available, such as independent corroborating evidence of trauma.

A study in 2018 revealed that the phenomena of pathological dissociation (including identity alteration) had been portrayed in the ancient Chinese medicine literature, suggesting that pathological dissociation is a cross-cultural condition.

A paper published in 2022  in the journal Comprehensive Psychiatry described how prolonged social media use, especially on video-sharing platforms including TikTok, has exposed young people, largely adolescent females, a core user group of TikTok, to a growing number of content creators making videos about their self-diagnosed disorders. “An increasing number of reports from the US, UK, Germany, Canada and Australia have noted an increase in functional tic-like behaviors prior to and during the Covid-19 pandemic, coinciding with an increase in social media content related to[…]dissociative identity disorder.” The paper concluded by saying there "is an urgent need for focused empirical research investigation into this concerning phenomenon that is related to the broader research and discourse examining social media influences on mental health”.

Screening
Perhaps due to their perceived rarity, the dissociative disorders (including DID) were not initially included in the Structured Clinical Interview for DSM-IV (SCID), which is designed to make psychiatric diagnoses more rigorous and reliable. Instead, shortly after the publication of the initial SCID a freestanding protocol for dissociative disorders (SCID-D) was published. This interview takes about 30 to 90 minutes depending on the subject's experiences. An alternative diagnostic instrument, the Dissociative Disorders Interview Schedule, also exists but the SCID-D is generally considered superior. The Dissociative Disorders Interview Schedule (DDIS) is a highly structured interview that discriminates among various DSM-IV diagnoses. The DDIS can usually be administered in 30–45 minutes.

Other questionnaires include the Dissociative Experiences Scale (DES), Perceptual Alterations Scale, Questionnaire on Experiences of Dissociation, Dissociation Questionnaire, and the Mini-SCIDD. All are strongly intercorrelated and except the Mini-SCIDD, all incorporate absorption, a normal part of personality involving narrowing or broadening of attention. The DES is a simple, quick, and validated questionnaire that has been widely used to screen for dissociative symptoms, with variations for children and adolescents. Tests such as the DES provide a quick method of screening subjects so that the more time-consuming structured clinical interview can be used in the group with high DES scores. Depending on where the cutoff is set, people who would subsequently be diagnosed can be missed. An early recommended cutoff was 15–20. The reliability of the DES in non-clinical samples has been questioned.

Treatment
Treatment aims to increase integrated functioning. The International Society for the Study of Trauma and Dissociation has published guidelines for phase-oriented treatment in adults as well as children and adolescents that are widely used in the field of DID treatment. The guidelines state that "a desirable treatment outcome is a workable form of integration or harmony among alternate identities". Some experts in treating people with DID use the techniques recommended in the 2011 treatment guidelines. The empirical research includes the longitudinal TOP DD treatment study, which found that patients showed "statistically significant reductions in dissociation, PTSD, distress, depression, hospitalisations, suicide attempts, self-harm, dangerous behaviours, drug use and physical pain" and improved overall functioning. Treatment effects have been studied for over thirty years, with some studies having a follow-up of ten years. Adult and child treatment guidelines exist that suggest a three-phased approach, and are based on expert consensus. Highly experienced therapists have few patients that achieve a unified identity.

Common treatment methods include an eclectic mix of psychotherapy techniques, including cognitive behavioral therapy (CBT), insight-oriented therapy, dialectical behavioral therapy (DBT), hypnotherapy and eye movement desensitization and reprocessing (EMDR).

Medications can be used for comorbid disorders or targeted symptom relief, for example antidepressants or treatments to improve sleep. Some behavior therapists initially use behavioral treatments such as only responding to a single identity, and then use more traditional therapy once a consistent response is established. Brief treatment due to managed care may be difficult, as individuals diagnosed with DID may have unusual difficulties in trusting a therapist and take a prolonged period to form a comfortable therapeutic alliance. Regular contact (at least weekly) is recommended, and treatment generally lasts years – not weeks or months. Sleep hygiene has been suggested as a treatment option, but has not been tested. In general there are very few clinical trials on the treatment of DID, none of which were randomized controlled trials.

Therapy for DID is generally phase oriented. Different alters may appear based on their greater ability to deal with specific situational stresses or threats. While some patients may initially present with a large number of alters, this number may reduce during treatment – though it is considered important for the therapist to become familiar with at least the more prominent personality states as the "host" personality may not be the "true" identity of the patient. Specific alters may react negatively to therapy, fearing the therapist's goal is to eliminate the alter (particularly those associated with illegal or violent activities). A more realistic and appropriate goal of treatment is to integrate adaptive responses to abuse, injury or other threats into the overall personality structure. There is debate over issues such as whether exposure therapy (reliving traumatic memories, also known as abreaction), engagement with alters and physical contact during therapy are appropriate and there are clinical opinions both for and against each option with little high-quality evidence for any position.

Brandt et al., commenting on the lack of empirical studies of treatment effectiveness, conducted a survey of 36 clinicians expert in treating dissociative disorder (DD) who recommended a three-stage treatment. They agreed that skill building in the first stage is important so the patient can learn to handle high risk, potentially dangerous behavior, as well as emotional regulation, interpersonal effectiveness and other practical behaviors. In addition, they recommended "trauma-based cognitive therapy" to reduce cognitive distortions related to trauma; they also recommended that the therapist deal with the dissociated identities early in treatment. In the middle stage, they recommended graded exposure techniques, along with appropriate interventions as needed. The treatment in the last stage was more individualized; few with DD  became integrated into one identity.

The first phase of therapy focuses on symptoms and relieving the distressing aspects of the condition, ensuring the safety of the individual, improving the patient's capacity to form and maintain healthy relationships, and improving general daily life functioning. Comorbid disorders such as substance use disorder and eating disorders are addressed in this phase of treatment. The second phase focuses on stepwise exposure to traumatic memories and prevention of re-dissociation. The final phase focuses on reconnecting the identities of disparate alters into a single functioning identity with all its memories and experiences intact.

A study was conducted to develop an "expertise-based prognostic model for the treatment of complex post-traumatic stress disorder (PTSD) and dissociative identity disorder (DID)". Researchers constructed a two-stage survey and factor analyses performed on the survey elements found 51 factors common to complex PTSD and DID. The authors concluded from their findings: "The model is supportive of the current phase-oriented treatment model, emphasizing the strengthening of the therapeutic relationship and the patient's resources in the initial stabilization phase. Further research is needed to test the model's statistical and clinical validity."

Prognosis
Little is known about prognosis of untreated DID. It rarely, if ever, goes away without treatment, but symptoms may resolve from time to time or wax and wane spontaneously. Patients with mainly dissociative and post-traumatic symptoms face a better prognosis than those with comorbid disorders or those still in contact with abusers, and the latter groups often face lengthier and more difficult treatment. Suicidal ideation, suicide attempts, and self-harm also may occur. Duration of treatment can vary depending on patient goals, which can range from merely improving inter-alter communication and cooperation, to reducing inter-alter amnesia, to integration of all alters, but generally takes years.

Epidemiology

General
According to the American Psychiatric Association, the 12-month prevalence of DID among adults in the US is 1.5%, with similar prevalence between women and men. Population prevalence estimates have been described to widely vary, with some estimates of DID in inpatient settings suggesting 1-9.6%." Reported rates in the community vary from 1% to 3% with higher rates among psychiatric patients. As of 2017, evidence suggested a prevalence of DID of 2–5% among psychiatric inpatients, 2–3% among outpatients, and 1% in the general population, with rates reported as high as 16.4% for teenagers in psychiatric outpatient services. Dissociative disorders in general have a prevalence of 12.0%–13.8% for psychiatric outpatients.

As of 2012, DID was diagnosed 5 to 9 times more common in women than men during young adulthood, although this may have been due to selection bias as men meeting DID diagnostic criteria were suspected to end up in the criminal justice system rather than hospitals. In children, rates among men and women are approximately the same (5:4). DID diagnoses are extremely rare in children; much of the research on childhood DID occurred in the 1980s and 1990s and does not address ongoing controversies surrounding the diagnosis. DID occurs more commonly in young adults and declines in prevalence with age.

There is a poor awareness of DID in the clinical settings and the general public. Poor clinical education (or lack thereof) for DID and other dissociative disorders has been described in literature: "most clinicians have been taught (or assume) that DID is a rare disorder with a florid, dramatic presentation." Symptoms in patients are often not easily visible, which complicates diagnosis. DID has a high correlation with, and has been described as a form of, complex post-traumatic stress disorder. There is a significant overlap of symptoms between borderline personality disorder and DID, although symptoms are understood to originate from different underlying causes.

Historical prevalence
Rates of diagnosed DID were increasing in the late 20th century, reaching a peak of diagnoses at approximately 40,000 cases by the end of the 20th century, up from less than 200 diagnoses before 1970. Initially DID along with the rest of the dissociative disorders were considered the rarest of psychological conditions, diagnosed in less than 100 by 1944, with only one further case reported in the next two decades. In the late 1970s and '80s, the number of diagnoses rose sharply. An estimate from the 1980s placed the incidence at 0.01%. Accompanying this rise was an increase in the number of alters, rising from only the primary and one alter personality in most cases, to an average of 13 in the mid-1980s (the increase in both number of cases and number of alters within each case are both factors in professional skepticism regarding the diagnosis). Others explain the increase as being due to the use of inappropriate therapeutic techniques in highly suggestible individuals, though this is itself controversial while proponents of DID claim the increase in incidence is due to increased recognition of and ability to recognize the disorder. Figures from psychiatric populations (inpatients and outpatients) show a wide diversity from different countries.

A 1996 essay suggested three possible causes for the sudden increase of DID diagnoses, among which the author suspects the first being most likely:

 The result of therapist suggestions to suggestible people, much as Charcot's hysterics acted in accordance with his expectations.
 Psychiatrists' past failure to recognize dissociation being redressed by new training and knowledge.
 Dissociative phenomena are actually increasing, but this increase only represents a new form of an old and protean entity: "hysteria".
Dissociative disorders were excluded from the Epidemiological Catchment Area Project.

North America
DID is considered a controversial diagnosis and condition, with much of the literature on DID still being generated and published in North America, to the extent that it was once regarded as a phenomenon confined to that continent. Although research has appeared discussing the appearance of DID in other countries and cultures and the condition has been described in non-English speaking nations and non-Western cultures, these reports all occur in English-language journals authored by international researchers who cite Western scientific literature and are therefore not isolated from Western influences. Etzel Cardeña and David Gleaves believed the overrepresentation of DID in North America was the result of increased awareness and training about the condition.

History

Early references
In the 19th century, "dédoublement", or "double consciousness", the historical precursor to DID, was frequently described as a state of sleepwalking, with scholars hypothesizing that the patients were switching between a normal consciousness and a "somnambulistic state".

An intense interest in spiritualism, parapsychology and hypnosis continued throughout the 19th and early 20th centuries, running in parallel with John Locke's views that there was an association of ideas requiring the coexistence of feelings with awareness of the feelings. Hypnosis, which was pioneered in the late 18th century by Franz Mesmer and Armand-Marie Jacques de Chastenet, Marques de Puységur, challenged Locke's association of ideas. Hypnotists reported what they thought were second personalities emerging during hypnosis and wondered how two minds could coexist.

In the 19th century, there were a number of reported cases of multiple personalities which Rieber estimated would be close to 100. Epilepsy was seen as a factor in some cases, and discussion of this connection continues into the present era.

By the late 19th century, there was a general acceptance that emotionally traumatic experiences could cause long-term disorders which might display a variety of symptoms. These conversion disorders were found to occur in even the most resilient individuals, but with profound effect in someone with emotional instability like Louis Vivet (1863–?), who had a traumatic experience as a 17-year-old when he encountered a viper. Vivet was the subject of countless medical papers and became the most studied case of dissociation in the 19th century.

Between 1880 and 1920, various international medical conferences devoted time to sessions on dissociation. It was in this climate that Jean-Martin Charcot introduced his ideas of the impact of nervous shocks as a cause for a variety of neurological conditions. One of Charcot's students, Pierre Janet, took these ideas and went on to develop his own theories of dissociation. One of the first individuals diagnosed with multiple personalities to be scientifically studied was Clara Norton Fowler, under the pseudonym Christine Beauchamp; American neurologist Morton Prince studied Fowler between 1898 and 1904, describing her case study in his 1906 monograph, Dissociation of a Personality.

20th century
In the early 20th century, interest in dissociation and multiple personalities waned for several reasons. After Charcot's death in 1893, many of his so-called hysterical patients were exposed as frauds, and Janet's association with Charcot tarnished his theories of dissociation. Sigmund Freud recanted his earlier emphasis on dissociation and childhood trauma.

In 1908, Eugen Bleuler introduced the term "schizophrenia" to represent a revised disease concept for Emil Kraepelin's dementia praecox. Whereas Kraepelin's natural disease entity was anchored in the metaphor of progressive deterioration and mental weakness and defect, Bleuler offered a reinterpretation based on dissociation or "splitting" (Spaltung) and widely broadened the inclusion criteria for the diagnosis. A review of the Index medicus from 1903 through 1978 showed a dramatic decline in the number of reports of multiple personality after the diagnosis of schizophrenia became popular, especially in the United States. The rise of the broad diagnostic category of dementia praecox has also been posited in the disappearance of "hysteria" (the usual diagnostic designation for cases of multiple personalities) by 1910. A number of factors helped create a large climate of skepticism and disbelief; paralleling the increased suspicion of DID was the decline of interest in dissociation as a laboratory and clinical phenomenon.

Starting in about 1927, there was a large increase in the number of reported cases of schizophrenia, which was matched by an equally large decrease in the number of multiple personality reports. With the rise of a uniquely American reframing of dementia praecox/schizophrenia as a functional disorder or "reaction" to psychobiological stressors – a theory first put forth by Adolf Meyer in 1906—many trauma-induced conditions associated with dissociation, including "shell shock" or "war neuroses" during World War I, were subsumed under these diagnoses. It was argued in the 1980s that DID patients were often misdiagnosed with schizophrenia.

The public, however, was exposed to psychological ideas which took their interest. Mary Shelley's Frankenstein, Robert Louis Stevenson's Strange Case of Dr Jekyll and Mr Hyde, and many short stories by Edgar Allan Poe had a formidable impact.

The Three Faces of Eve
In 1957, with the publication of the bestselling book The Three Faces of Eve by psychiatrists Corbett H. Thigpen and Hervey M. Cleckley, based on a case study of their patient Chris Costner Sizemore, and the subsequent popular movie of the same name, the American public's interest in multiple personality was revived. More cases of dissociative identity disorder were diagnosed in the following years. The cause of the sudden increase of cases is indefinite, but it may be attributed to the increased awareness, which revealed previously undiagnosed cases or new cases may have been induced by the influence of the media on the behavior of individuals and the judgement of therapists. During the 1970s an initially small number of clinicians campaigned to have it considered a legitimate diagnosis.

History in the DSM
The DSM-II used the term hysterical neurosis, dissociative type. It described the possible occurrence of alterations in the patient's state of consciousness or identity, and included the symptoms of "amnesia, somnambulism, fugue, and multiple personality". The DSM-III grouped the diagnosis with the other four major dissociative disorders using the term "multiple personality disorder". The DSM-IV made more changes to DID than any other dissociative disorder, and renamed it DID. The name was changed for two reasons: First, the change emphasizes the main problem is not a multitude of personalities, but rather a lack of a single, unified identity and an emphasis on "the identities as centers of information processing". Second, the term "personality" is used to refer to "characteristic patterns of thoughts, feelings, moods, and behaviors of the whole individual", while for a patient with DID, the switches between identities and behavior patterns is the personality. It is for this reason the DSM-IV-TR referred to "distinct identities or personality states" instead of personalities. The diagnostic criteria also changed to indicate that while the patient may name and personalize alters, they lack independent, objective existence. The changes also included the addition of amnesia as a symptom, which was not included in the DSM-III-R because despite being a core symptom of the condition, patients may experience "amnesia for the amnesia" and fail to report it. Amnesia was replaced when it became clear that the risk of false negative diagnoses was low because amnesia was central to DID.

The ICD-10 places the diagnosis in the category of "dissociative disorders", within the subcategory of "other dissociative (conversion) disorders", but continues to list the condition as multiple personality disorder.

The DSM-IV-TR criteria for DID have been criticized for failing to capture the clinical complexity of DID, lacking usefulness in diagnosing individuals with DID (for instance, by focusing on the two least frequent and most subtle symptoms of DID) producing a high rate of false negatives and an excessive number of DDNOS diagnoses, for excluding possession (seen as a cross-cultural form of DID), and for including only two "core" symptoms of DID (amnesia and self-alteration) while failing to discuss hallucinations, trance-like states, somatoform, depersonalization, and derealization symptoms. Arguments have been made for allowing diagnosis through the presence of some, but not all of the characteristics of DID rather than the current exclusive focus on the two least common and noticeable features. The DSM-IV-TR criteria have also been criticized  for being tautological, using imprecise and undefined language and for the use of instruments that give a false sense of validity and empirical certainty to the diagnosis.

The DSM-5 updated the definition of DID in 2013, summarizing the changes as:

Between 1968 and 1980, the term that was used for dissociative identity disorder was "Hysterical neurosis, dissociative type". The APA wrote in the second edition of the DSM: "In the dissociative type, alterations may occur in the patient's state of consciousness or in his identity, to produce such symptoms as amnesia, somnambulism, fugue, and multiple personality." The number of cases sharply increased in the late 1970s and throughout the 80s, and the first scholarly monographs on the topic appeared in 1986.

Book and film Sybil
In 1974, the highly influential book Sybil was published, and later made into a miniseries in 1976 and again in 2007. Describing what Robert Rieber called "the third most famous of multiple personality cases," it presented a detailed discussion of the problems of treatment of "Sybil Isabel Dorsett", a pseudonym for Shirley Ardell Mason.

Though the book and subsequent films helped popularize the diagnosis and trigger an epidemic of the diagnosis, later analysis of the case suggested different interpretations, ranging from Mason's problems having been caused by the therapeutic methods used by her psychiatrist, C. B. Wilbur, or an inadvertent hoax due in part to the lucrative publishing rights, though this conclusion has itself been challenged.

David Spiegel, a Stanford psychiatrist whose father treated Shirley Ardell Mason on occasion, says that his father described Mason as "a brilliant hysteric. He felt that Wilbur tended to pressure her to exaggerate on the dissociation she already had."  As media attention on DID increased, so too did the controversy surrounding the diagnosis.

Re-classifications
With the publication of the DSM-III, which omitted the terms "hysteria" and "neurosis" (and thus the former categories for dissociative disorders), dissociative diagnoses became "orphans" with their own categories with dissociative identity disorder appearing as "multiple personality disorder".

In the opinion of McGill University psychiatrist Joel Paris, this inadvertently legitimized them by forcing textbooks, which mimicked the structure of the DSM, to include a separate chapter on them and resulted in an increase in diagnosis of dissociative conditions. Once a rarely occurring spontaneous phenomenon (research in 1944 showed only 76 cases), the diagnosis became "an artifact of bad (or naïve) psychotherapy" as patients capable of dissociating were accidentally encouraged to express their symptoms by "overly fascinated" therapists.

In a 1986 book chapter (later reprinted in another volume), philosopher of science Ian Hacking focused on multiple personality disorder as an example of "making up people" through the untoward effects on individuals of the "dynamic nominalism" in medicine and psychiatry. With the invention of new terms entire new categories of "natural kinds" of people are assumed to be created, and those thus diagnosed respond by re-creating their identity in light of the new cultural, medical, scientific, political and moral expectations. Hacking argued that the process of "making up people" is historically contingent, hence it is not surprising to find the rise, fall, and resurrection of such categories over time. Hacking revisited his concept of "making up people" in a 2006.

"Interpersonality amnesia" was removed as a diagnostic feature from the DSM III in 1987, which may have contributed to the increasing frequency of the diagnosis. There were 200 reported cases of DID as of 1980, and 20,000 from 1980 to 1990. Joan Acocella reports that 40,000 cases were diagnosed from 1985 to 1995. Scientific publications regarding DID peaked in the mid-1990s then rapidly declined.

There were several contributing factors to the rapid decline of reports of multiple personality disorder/dissociative identity disorder. One was the discontinuation in December 1997 of Dissociation: Progress in the Dissociative Disorders, the journal of The International Society for the Study of Multiple Personality and Dissociation. The society and its journal were perceived as uncritical sources of legitimacy for the extraordinary claims of the existence of intergenerational satanic cults responsible for a "hidden holocaust" of Satanic ritual abuse that was linked to the rise of MPD reports. In an effort to distance itself from the increasing skepticism regarding the clinical validity of MPD, the organization dropped "multiple personality" from its official name in 1993, and then in 1997 changed its name again to the International Society for the Study of Trauma and Dissociation.

In 1994, the fourth edition of the DSM replaced the criteria again and changed the name of the condition from "multiple personality disorder" to the current "dissociative identity disorder" to emphasize the importance of changes to consciousness and identity rather than personality. The inclusion of interpersonality amnesia helped to distinguish DID from dissociative disorder not otherwise specified (DDNOS), but the condition retains an inherent subjectivity due to difficulty in defining terms such as personality, identity, ego-state, and even amnesia. The ICD-10 classified DID as a "Dissociative [conversion] disorder" and used the name "multiple personality disorder" with the classification number of F44.81. In the ICD-11, the World Health Organization have classified DID under the name "dissociative identity disorder" (code 6B64), and most cases formerly diagnosed as DDNOS are classified as "partial dissociative identity disorder" (code 6B65).

21st century
A 2006 study compared scholarly research and publications on DID and dissociative amnesia to other mental health conditions, such as anorexia nervosa, alcohol use disorder, and schizophrenia from 1984 to 2003. The results were found to be unusually distributed, with a very low level of publications in the 1980s followed by a significant rise that peaked in the mid-1990s and subsequently rapidly declined in the decade following. Compared to 25 other diagnosis, the mid-1990s "bubble" of publications regarding DID was unique. In the opinion of the authors of the review, the publication results suggest a period of "fashion" that waned, and that the two diagnoses "[did] not command widespread scientific acceptance."

Society and culture

General
The public's long fascination with DID has led to a number of different books and films, with many representations described as increasing stigma by perpetuating the myth that people with mental illness are usually dangerous. Movies about DID have been also criticized for poor representation of both DID and its treatment, including "greatly overrepresenting" the role of hypnosis in therapy, showing a significantly smaller number of personalities than many people with DID have, and misrepresenting people with DID as having flamboyant and obvious personalities. Some movies are parodies and ridicule DID, for instance Me, Myself & Irene, which also incorrectly states that DID is schizophrenia. In some stories DID is used as a plot device, e.g. in Fight Club, and in whodunnit stories like Secret Window.

United States of Tara was reported to be the first US television series with DID as its focus, and a professional commentary on each episode was published by the International Society for the Study of Trauma and Dissociation. More recently, the award winning Korean TV series Kill Me, Heal Me featured a wealthy young man with seven identities, one of whom falls in love with the beautiful psychiatry resident who tries to help him.

In a Dissociative Identity Disorder documentary by A&E named, Many Sides Of Jane, it follows a young mom struggling to be a single mom with Dissociative Identity Disorder. Jane wants to bring awareness to the disorder.

Most people with DID are believed to downplay or minimize their symptoms rather than seeking fame, often due to shame or fear of the effects of stigma. Therapists may discourage people with DID from media work due to concerns that they may feel exploited or traumatized, for example as a result of demonstrating switching between personality states to entertain others.

However, a number of people with DID have publicly spoken about their experiences, including comedian and talk show host Roseanne Barr, who interviewed Truddi Chase, author of When Rabbit Howls; Chris Costner Sizemore, the subject of The Three Faces of Eve, Cameron West, author of First Person Plural: My life as a multiple, and NFL player Herschel Walker, author of Breaking Free: My life with dissociative identity disorder.

In The Three Faces of Eve (1957) hypnosis is used to identify a childhood trauma which then allows her to fuse from three identities into just one. However, Sizemore's own books I'm Eve and A Mind of My Own revealed that this did not last; she later attempted suicide, sought further treatment, and actually had twenty-two personalities rather than three. Sizemore re-entered therapy and by 1974 had achieved a lasting recovery. Voices Within: The Lives of Truddi Chase portrays many of the 92 personalities Chase described in her book When Rabbit Howls, and is unusual in breaking away from the typical ending of integrating into one. Frankie & Alice (2010), starring Halle Berry; and the TV mini-series Sybil were also based on real people with DID. In popular culture dissociative identity disorder is often confused with schizophrenia, and some movies advertised as representing dissociative identity disorder may be more representative of psychosis or schizophrenia, for example Psycho (1960).

In his book The C.I.A. Doctors: Human Rights Violations by American Psychiatrists, psychiatrist Colin A. Ross states that based on documents obtained through freedom of information legislation, a psychiatrist linked to Project MKULTRA reported being able to deliberately induce dissociative identity disorder using a variety of aversive or abusive techniques, creating a Manchurian Candidate for military purposes.

A DID community exists on social media, including YouTube, Reddit, Discord, and TikTok. However, numerous high-profile members of this community have been criticized for faking their condition for views, or for portraying the disorder lightheartedly. Conversely, psychologist Naomi Torres-Mackie, head of research at The Mental Health Coalition, has stated "All of a sudden, all of my adolescent patients think that they have this, and they don't ... Folks start attaching clinical meaning and feeling like, 'I should be diagnosed with this. I need medication for this', when actually a lot of these experiences are normative and don't need to be pathologized or treated."

In the USA Network television production Mr. Robot, the protagonist Elliot Alderson was created using anecdotal experiences of DID of the show's creator's friends. Sam Esmail said he consulted with a psychologist who "concretized" the character's mental health conditions, especially his plurality.

In M. Night Shyamalan's Unbreakable superhero film series (specifically the films, Split and Glass), one character is diagnosed with DID, and that some of the personalities have super-human powers. Some advocates believe that the films are a negative portrayal.

Another film about Dissociative Identity Disorder, folks felt is a negative portrayal is My Soul To Take (2010). It features two characters with Dissociative Identity Disorder, a father and son. One has an alter that is a serial killer but in real life that's extremely rare and in no way represents Dissociative Identity Disorder. The same should be said for the film Identity (2003). A film about a serial killer with extreme Dissociative Identity Disorder. Horror films like these communicate misconceptions and misinformation, not necessarily disinformation, and cause folks to believe those with trauma or Dissociative Identity Disorder specifically are serial killers. This is the furthered from the truth.

Drop Dead Fred (1991) features an adult woman who has gone though a significantly traumatic childhood with many of the symptoms of Dissociative Identity Disorder. She even has an "imaginary friend" named Drop Dead Fred well into her adult years. The disorder is referred to as Imaginary Friend Syndrome instead of Dissociative Identity Disorder or its many synonyms. She learns to overcome her childhood trauma with the help of Drop Dead Fred, who is very mischievous.

In Marvel Comics, the character of Moon Knight is shown to have DID. In the TV series Moon Knight based on the comic book character, protagonist Marc Spector is depicted with DID; the website for the National Alliance on Mental Illness appears in the series' end credits. Another Marvel character, Legion, has DID in the comics, although he has schizophrenia in the TV show version.

Legal issues
People with dissociative identity disorder may be involved in legal cases as a witness, defendant, or as the victim/injured party. Claims of DID have been used only rarely to argue criminal insanity in court. In the United States dissociative identity disorder has previously been found to meet the Frye test as a generally accepted medical condition, and the newer Daubert standard. Within legal circles, DID has been described as one of the most disputed psychiatric diagnoses and forensic assessments are needed. For defendants whose defense states they have a diagnosis of DID, courts must distinguish between those who genuinely have DID and those who are malingering to avoid responsibility, as shown in the fictional book and film Primal Fear. Expert witnesses are typically used to assess defendants in such cases, although some of the standard assessments like the MMPI-2 were not developed for people with a trauma history and the validity scales may incorrectly suggest malingering. The Multiscale Dissociation Inventory (Briere, 2002) is well suited to assessing malingering and dissociative disorders, unlike the self-report Dissociative Experiences Scale. In DID, evidence about the altered states of consciousness, actions of alter identities and episodes of amnesia may be excluded from a court if they not considered relevant, although different countries and regions have different laws. A diagnosis of DID may be used to claim a defense of not guilty by reason of insanity, but this very rarely succeeds, or of diminished capacity, which may reduce the length of a sentence. DID may also affect competency to stand trial. A not guilty by reason of insanity plea was first used successfully in an American court in 1978, in the State of Ohio v. Milligan case. However, a DID diagnosis is not automatically considered a justification for an insanity verdict, and since Milligan the few cases claiming insanity have largely been unsuccessful.

Advocacy movement
In the context of neurodiversity, the experience of dissociative identities has been called multiplicity and has led to advocacy for the recognition of 'positive plurality' and the use of plural pronouns such as "we" and "our". Liz Fong-Jones states those with this condition might have fear in regard to "coming out" about their DID, as it could put them in a vulnerable position.

In particular, advocates have challenged the necessity of integration. Timothy Baynes argues that alters have full moral status, just as their host does. He states that as integration may entail the (involuntary) elimination of such an entity, forcing people to undergo it as a therapeutic treatment is "seriously immoral".

A DID (or Dissociative Identities) Awareness Day takes place on March 5 annually, and a multicolored awareness ribbon is used, based on the idea of a "crazy quilt".

Resources
Acceptance Commitment Therapy

National Alliance on Mental Illness (NAMI)

Nurse Labs for Dissociative Disorders

Liberty Moon

did-research

Department of Mental health

Program of Assertive Community Treatment (PACT)

farmbox RX

Project Bread

Mom's Meals

https://www.samhsa.gov/trauma-violence

https://www.mentalhealth.va.gov/

http://traumadissociation.com/alters

Wellness Recovery Action Plan

Emotional First Aid

Peer Support Specialist

NAMI Resources For Dissociative Disorders

https://www.isst-d.org/

https://mosaicminds.org/about-forums/

https://www.networktherapy.com/

https://www.healthyplace.com/blogs/dissociativeliving

Explanatory notes

References

External links

 

Dissociative disorders
Memory disorders
Wikipedia medicine articles ready to translate